Bertie Victor Cooksley  (13 July 1892 – 26 July 1980), always known as Bert Cooksley, was a New Zealand politician of the National Party.

Biography

Cooksley was born in 1892 in Dunsandel, Canterbury. He attended Dunsdale School. He farmed in Taita in the Hutt Valley. He went with the New Zealand Expeditionary Force into World War I and landed at Gallipoli. He gave his birth as August 1892 (WWI) and August 1894 (WWII), rather than 13 July 1892.

He was a market gardener (growing vegetables commercially), and in 1944 was President of the New Zealand Council of Commercial Gardeners.

In 1943, he stood unsuccessfully in the 1943 general election for the seat of Otaki, on behalf of the National Party.

He represented the Wairarapa electorate from 1949 and held it to 1963, when he retired.

Cooksley was awarded the Military Medal in World War I. In 1953, he received the Queen Elizabeth II Coronation Medal, and he was appointed an Officer of the Order of the British Empire for community service in the 1965 New Year Honours.

Cooksley died at Waikanae in 1980, and his ashes were buried in Waikanae Cemetery.

References

1892 births
1980 deaths
New Zealand National Party MPs
New Zealand farmers
Members of the New Zealand House of Representatives
New Zealand MPs for North Island electorates
New Zealand recipients of the Military Medal
New Zealand Officers of the Order of the British Empire
New Zealand military personnel of World War I
Unsuccessful candidates in the 1943 New Zealand general election